Diódoro Corella (born 1838 in Arizpe, Sonora - died June 15, 1876 in Mexico City) was a Mexican military leader. Corella was a republican and strongly opposed French Intervention in Mexico, reason why he was exiled by the conservative government. He returned to Mexico upon the victory of Benito Juárez and fought against Porfirio Díaz when he tried to rise to power. His remains were interred at the Panteón de Dolores in Mexico City, in the Rotunda of Illustrious Persons on June 17, 1876.

References 

1838 births
1876 deaths
Mexican military personnel
People from Arizpe